Greenwich and Woolwich   is a constituency represented in the House of Commons of the UK Parliament since 2015 by Matthew Pennycook of the Labour Party.

Constituency profile
The seat is dominated in the south by expansive and panoramic Greenwich Park with an acute demand for housing, particularly in the western half,  due to architecturally-rich conservation areas and very close proximity to Canary Wharf and City of London.
There remain some industrial areas in the former Royal Docks and around North Greenwich. The seat includes  considerable social dependency in its Greenwich and Woolwich town centres, including in social housing,

History
Since 1997
The constituency was created for the 1997 general election by the merger of the former Greenwich constituency, and the western half of the former Woolwich constituency. It has been controlled by the Labour Party since its creation, when they polled 63.4% of the vote and a majority of 44.8%. Thirteen years later, the 2010 general election produced the smallest majority as a share of the vote, 24.7%, with the Labour candidate taking 49.2% of votes cast.

The 2015 general election result was the 105th-safest Labour majority of 232 seats won by Labour at that election.

Greenwich forerunner
Reflecting a demographic split in the latter twentieth century were five and eleven-year periods when the two predecessor seats were represented by candidates from the SDP.

The former Greenwich constituency was a secure Labour Party seat for much of the twentieth century, though it had been a safe Liberal seat throughout most of the nineteenth century. In 1987, it was gained by the Social Democratic Party at a by-election and narrowly regained by Labour five years later at the 1992 general election.

Woolwich forerunner
The former Woolwich constituency (and its predecessor Woolwich East) was a similar safe-Liberal-seat-turned-safe-Labour-seat. Its Labour MP Christopher Mayhew defected to the Liberal Party in 1974 before being defeated, and his Labour successor, John Cartwright, defected to the SDP in 1981. He retained the seat at the 1983 and 1987 general elections, but narrowly lost it to Labour in 1992; in a similar fashion to the neighboring Greenwich seat. In council elections, since the seat's 1997 creation, most wards have tended to elect Labour councillors and few wards other than the Blackheath Westcombe ward have tended to elect Conservative councilors.

1945-1997 combined summary
Including the pre-1997 predecessors, the area has since World War II been a Labour safe seat, or, as indicated in the 1987 result for Greenwich only, in the best result for a Conservative candidate locally during the years since 1955, occasionally a marginal.

Boundaries

1997–2010: The London Borough of Greenwich wards of Arsenal, Blackheath, Burrage, Charlton, Ferrier, Hornfair, Kidbrooke, Nightingale, Rectory Field, St Alfege, St Mary's, Trafalgar, Vanbrugh, West, and Woolwich Common.

2010–present: The London Borough of Greenwich wards of Blackheath Westcombe, Charlton, Glyndon, Greenwich West, Peninsula, Woolwich Common, and Woolwich Riverside.

Following their review of parliamentary representation in South London, and as a consequence of changes to ward boundaries, the Boundary Commission for England recommended that part of Woolwich Common ward be transferred to Greenwich and Woolwich from the constituency of Eltham; that parts of Glyndon ward be transferred from Eltham and Erith and Thamesmead; and that parts of Kidbrooke with Hornfair ward, Eltham West ward, and Middle Park and Sutcliffe ward be transferred from Greenwich and Woolwich to Eltham.

Members of Parliament

Election results

Elections in the 2010s

Elections in the 2000s

Elections in the 1990s

Notes

References

External links 
Politics Resources (Election results from 1922 onwards)
Electoral Calculus (Election results from 1955 onwards)

See also 
 List of parliamentary constituencies in London

Politics of the Royal Borough of Greenwich
Parliamentary constituencies in London
Constituencies of the Parliament of the United Kingdom established in 1997
Woolwich